A mackerel sky is a common term for clouds made up of rows of cirrocumulus or altocumulus clouds displaying an undulating, rippling pattern similar in appearance to fish scales; this is caused by high altitude atmospheric waves.

Cirrocumulus appears almost exclusively with cirrus some way ahead of a warm front and is a reliable forecaster that the weather is about to change. When these high clouds progressively invade the sky and the barometric pressure begins to fall, precipitation associated with the disturbance is likely about 6 to 12 hours away. A thickening and lowering of cirrocumulus into middle-étage altostratus or altocumulus is a good sign that the warm front or low front has moved closer and it may start raining within less than six hours. The old rhymes "Mackerel sky, not twenty-four hours dry" and "Mares' tails and mackerel scales make lofty ships to carry low sails" both refer to this long-recognized phenomenon.
 
Other phrases in weather lore take mackerel skies as a sign of changeable weather. Examples include "Mackerel sky, mackerel sky. Never long wet and never long dry", and "A dappled sky, like a painted woman, soon changes its face".

It is sometimes known as a buttermilk sky, particularly when in the early cirrocumulus stage, in reference to the clouds' "curdled" appearance. In France it is sometimes called a ciel moutonné (fleecy sky); and in Spain a cielo empedrado (cobbled sky); in Germany it is known as Schäfchenwolken (sheep clouds), and in Italy the clouds are described as a pecorelle (like little sheep).

In culture

Peter Paul Rubens' A View of Het Steen in the Early Morning (1636) features the first convincing depiction of a mackerel sky in art.

"Ole Buttermilk Sky" by Hoagy Carmichael was nominated for an Academy Award for Best Original Song in 1946.

Gallery

References

External links

Cumulus